Pieter Bottema (born 13 December 1978) is a Dutch lightweight rower. He won a gold medal at the 2007 World Rowing Championships in Munich with the lightweight men's eight.

References

1978 births
Living people
Dutch male rowers
World Rowing Championships medalists for the Netherlands